Orbilia is a genus of fungi in the family Orbiliaceae. Anamorphs of this genus include the Arthrobotrys, Dactylella, Dicranidion, Dwayaangam, Helicoön, Monacrosporium, and Trinacrium.
The genus was established in 1836 by Elias Magnus Fries to accommodate the species Peziza leucostigma. The mycologist Josef Velenovský wrote articles describing species found in Bohemia and Moravia (Czechoslovakia). In 1951, Fred Jay Seaver recorded 20 species in North America, and R.W.G. Dennis later described 9 species from Venezuela. According to the Dictionary of the Fungi (10th edition, 2008), there are about 58 species in the genus.

Species

Orbilia acuum
Orbilia alnea
Orbilia antenorea
Orbilia arundinacea
Orbilia aurantiorubra
Orbilia auricolor
Orbilia bannaensis
Orbilia bomiensis
Orbilia brevicauda
Orbilia coccinella
Orbilia comma
Orbilia corculispora
Orbilia cruenta
Orbilia cunninghamii
Orbilia curvatispora
Orbilia cyathea
Orbilia delicatula
Orbilia dorsalia
Orbilia epipora
Orbilia eucalypti
Orbilia euonymi
Orbilia falciformis
Orbilia fimicoloides
Orbilia gambelii
Orbilia leucostigma
Orbilia luteorubella
Orbilia luzularum
Orbilia milinana
Orbilia pellucida
Orbilia pilifera
Orbilia piloboloides
Orbilia quercus
Orbilia rectispora
Orbilia retrusa
Orbilia sarraziniana
Orbilia scolecospora
Orbilia tenebricosa
Orbilia tricellularia
Orbilia umbilicata
Orbilia vermiformis
Orbilia vinosa
Orbilia xanthostigma
Orbilia yuanensis

References

External links
Several images of various species

Pezizomycotina
Ascomycota genera
Taxa named by Elias Magnus Fries
Taxa described in 1836